Fight for Sight may refer to:

Fight for Sight (U.S.), an American organization
Fight for Sight (UK), a British organization